The Surat helmeted bat (Cassistrellus dimissus) is a species of vesper bat. It ranges from Thailand and Laos west to Nepal.

Taxonomy 
This species was formerly classified in the genus Eptesicus until phylogenetic analysis found it to belong a distinct genus in the tribe Vespertilionini, and thus reclassified it in the newly described genus Cassistrellus.

Distribution
Cassistrellus dimissus has been found in Khao Nong, Tai Rom Yen National Park, Surat Thani Province, southern Thailand and in Royal Chitwan National Park, southern Nepal.

Sources

Cassistrellus
Bats of Asia
Taxa named by Oldfield Thomas
Mammals described in 1916
Taxonomy articles created by Polbot
Taxobox binomials not recognized by IUCN